Custer County Airport  is a public-use airport located  southwest of Custer, South Dakota, United States.

Although most U.S. airports use the same three-letter location identifier for the FAA, ICAO and IATA, Custer County Airport is assigned CUT by the FAA and KCUT by the ICAO but has no designation from the IATA.

Facilities 

References

External links 

Airports in South Dakota
Buildings and structures in Custer County, South Dakota
Transportation in Custer County, South Dakota
Airports established in 1969
1969 establishments in South Dakota